Enchanted is the sixth studio album by the British singer/songwriter Marc Almond. It was released on 7 August 1990 and reached number 52 on the UK Albums Chart and number 81 on the Dutch albums chart. Enchanted includes the singles "A Lover Spurned" (a UK Top 30 hit featuring actress Julie T. Wallace), "The Desperate Hours" and "Waifs and Strays" (the latter of which was remixed by The Grid).

Background
The songs for the album were recorded at Marcus, Beethoven Street, Sarm West, Advision, and Mayfair Studios, London. Almond was accompanied by former La Magia and Willing Sinners member Billy McGee, and various studio musicians. Almond worked with three producers, Bob Kraushaar and Gary Maughan oversaw half of the tracks each, while Stephen Hague produced the lead single "A Lover Spurned".

Almond has described the recording process of this album as one of "conflict" between himself and producer Kraushaar. Writing in his autobiography Tainted Life, Almond describes how in the recording he wanted "spontaneity and surprise, passion and grit" and that he "wanted to be the conductor, waving my baton as musicians came in and out, brandishing strange instruments that created exotic sounds", whereas Kraushaar "was a technophile, and would have happily replaced everyone with the passionless dependability of his computer if he could." However, Almond concedes that "A year later I played the album and loved it. Bob Kraushaar had produced a highly polished, wonderful-sounding album, which at the time I just couldn't hear."

The album was reissued on CD in 2002 having been remastered. The artwork was designed by Green Ink with a cover photograph of Almond and Zuleika by Pierre et Gilles. Almond has stated that it is his favourite album cover.

Track listing

Personnel

Players
 Marc Almond – vocals, arrangements
 Billy McGee – keyboards, bass guitar, orchestra arrangements, conductor, arrangements, brass arrangement ("Deaths Diary" and "Orpheus in Red Velvet")
 Gary Maughan – Fairlight, additional keyboards, percussion
 Jack Emblow – accordion
 Enrico Tomasso – brass arrangement ("Deaths Diary" and "Orpheus in Red Velvet")
 The False Harmonics String Ensemble – string orchestra

Additional players
 "Madame De La Luna"
Enrico Tomasso – flugelhorn
Chris Tombling – soloist, violin
Blair Booth – backing vocals
 "Waifs and Strays"
Hossam Ramzy – percussion
Betsy Cook – backing vocals, keyboards
 "The Desperate Hours"
Richard Bissel – French horn
Juan Ramirez – flamenco guitar, handclaps
Roland Sutherland – flute
Linda Taylor – backing vocals
Maggie Ryder – backing vocals
Suzie O'List – backing vocals
 "Toreador in the Rain"
Chris Tombling – soloist, violin
Enrico Tomasso – trumpet
 "Widow Weeds"
Hossam Ramzy – percussion
Bashir Abdelal – flute
Kay Garner – backing vocals
Betsy Cook – soloist, voice
 "A Lover Spurned"
Julie T. Wallace – voice
Stephen Hague – keyboards
 "Deaths Diary"
Enrico Tomasso – trumpet
Clare Torry – backing vocals
Kay Garner – backing vocals
Stephanie De-Sykes – backing vocals
Betsy Cook – keyboards
 "The Sea Still Sings"
Dave Gregory – guitar
Clare Torry – backing vocals
Kay Garner – backing vocals
Stephanie De-Sykes – backing vocals
 "Carnival of Life"
Marie France – soloist, voice
Clare Torry – backing vocals
Kay Garner – backing vocals
Stephanie De-Sykes – backing vocals
Bob Kraushaar – acoustic guitar
 "Orpheus in Red Velvet"
Hossam Ramzy – percussion
Enrico Tomasso – trumpet
Betsy Cook – backing vocals

Technical
 Bob Kraushaar – Producer (all tracks except "A Lover Spurned")
 Gary Maughan – Producer (all tracks except "The Desperate Hours" and "A Lover Spurned")
 Stephen Hague – Producer ("A Lover Spurned")
 Bob Kraushaar – Mixing (all tracks except "A Lover Spurned")
 Mike "Spike" Drake – Mixing ("A Lover Spurned") and Additional engineering
 Grant Nicholas, Kevin Whyte, Ron Swan, Simon Duff, Simon Gogerly and Steve Fitzmaurice – Assistant Engineer
 Zuleika – Model
 Pierre Et Giles – Cover Photo
 Green Ink – Direct Art

Covers 

 The song 'A Lover Spurned' was covered in Cantonese by singer Leon Lai in 1992 on his album 但願不只是朋友 under the name 情歸落泊,

References

External links
 Marc Almond official website

Marc Almond albums
1990 albums
Albums produced by Stephen Hague
Parlophone albums